= Véronique Gallo =

Belgian writer and actor

Véronique Gallo is a Belgian writer and actor. She was born in 1976 in Liège. She has a degree in literature, a subject she taught for nearly ten years. Now an actress and playwright, she is the author and creator of the Vie de Mère series and the show The One Mother Show, acclaimed by audiences in Belgium, Switzerland and France. Her first novel Tout ce silence was published in 2012.
